Timo Pauli Blomqvist (born January 23, 1961) is a Finnish former ice hockey player. As a youth, he played in the 1973 Quebec International Pee-Wee Hockey Tournament with a minor ice hockey team from Espoo. Drafted in 1980 by the Washington Capitals, Blomqvist also played briefly for the New Jersey Devils before he returned to play hockey in Europe.

Awards
 Won the Swedish Elitserien Champion (Le Mat Trophy) in 1991–92.
 Awarded the U18 EJC All-Star Team in 1978, 1979.

Career statistics

Regular season and playoffs

International

References

External links

Profile at hockeydraftcentral.com

1961 births
Living people
Binghamton Whalers players
Espoo Blues players
Finnish ice hockey defencemen
Hershey Bears players
Ice hockey players at the 1988 Winter Olympics
Ice hockey players at the 1992 Winter Olympics
Jokerit players
Malmö Redhawks players
Modo Hockey players
New Jersey Devils players
New Jersey Devils scouts
Olympic ice hockey players of Finland
Olympic medalists in ice hockey
Olympic silver medalists for Finland
Ice hockey people from Helsinki
Washington Capitals draft picks
Washington Capitals players
20th-century Finnish people